Hollister v National Farmers’ Union [1979] ICR 542 is a UK labour law case concerning redundancy and unfair dismissal.

Facts
Mr Hollister worked in Cornwall for the National Farmers’ Union as a secretary, earning commission on getting insurance with Cornish Mutual Association Co for members. The secretaries complained their pay was lower than in the rest of the country, so head office negotiated new terms, but without consulting the Cornwall secretaries. Mr Hollister said the new terms were insufficient, and he refused to accept. He thought though there was a slight increase in pay, the pension entitlements were not as good. He was dismissed, and so claimed it was unfair.

The Tribunal found the dismissal was for some other substantial reason and there was no duty to consult. The EAT held that the dismissal was for a substantial reason, but the level of consultation was not enough to discharge the onus that their action was reasonable.

Judgment
The Court of Appeal held the dismissal was a “substantial reason of a kind such as to justify the dismissal” within EPA 1974 Sch 1, para 6(1)(b). There was no requirement to consult the claimant specifically. Consultation was one factor among many that could be taken into account. Lord Denning MR held that a business reorganisation like this could be ‘some other substantial reason’.

Eveleigh LJ concurred.

Sir Stanley Rees concurred.

See also

UK labour law
Unfair dismissal

Notes

References

United Kingdom labour case law
Court of Appeal (England and Wales) cases
United Kingdom employment contract case law
1979 in case law
1979 in British law
Lord Denning cases